is a Japanese voice actress from Miyagi Prefecture who is affiliated with Apollo Bay. She began her voice acting activities in 2021 after winning an open audition to voice Kanon Shibuya, the protagonist of the anime series Love Live! Superstar!!.

Biography
Date was born in Miyagi Prefecture on September 30, 2002. She had aspired to become a voice actress from an early age. While in elementary school she became a fan of the multimedia franchise Love Live! and dreamed of becoming part of the franchise. She considered attending a vocational school after graduating from high school, but during her third year she learned that the series was holding an open audition for roles in a new upcoming project. She decided to participate as she felt that she may not have another opportunity to participate in such an audition. She participated in the audition and was selected to be among the project's cast members. She was cast as Kanon Shibuya, the protagonist of the new project, now titled Love Live! Superstar!!. She made her voice acting debut when the project's anime series began in 2021. In October of the same year she started hosting a radio show on the online radio station A&G.

In 2022 she released a photobook titled  to celebrate her 20th birthday.

Filmography

Anime
2021
Love Live! Superstar!!, Kanon Shibuya
2022
Love Live! Superstar!! 2nd Season, Kanon Shibuya

References

External links
Official agency profile 

2002 births
Living people
Japanese voice actresses
Voice actresses from Miyagi Prefecture